Lei Zhenchun was a Chinese general and Minister of war of the Republic of China in July 1917.

Republic of China Army generals